, was a politician and cabinet minister in the Empire of Japan, serving as governor of Akita Prefecture and of Tokushima Prefecture, and as a member of the Lower House of the Diet of Japan seven times, and once as a cabinet minister.

Biography 
Hata was born in Tsukiji, Tokyo, where his father, a shipping magnate, was Vice-Speaker of the Tokyo Metropolitan Assembly. Hata graduated from the law school of Tokyo Imperial University, and found a position as a bureaucrat within the Home Ministry in 1896.

In May 1897, Hata was appointed a legal councilor to Fukui Prefecture. This was followed by assignments in Ehime, Chiba and Kanagawa Prefectures. In April 1905, he was sent to Europe for studies, returning in May 1906. In July 1906 he was sent to Nagasaki Prefecture has the head representative of the Home Ministry.

In March 1912, Hata assumed the post of governor of Akita Prefecture, which he held to 1914. He was then assigned the post of governor of Tokushima Prefecture from 1914 to 1915.
Hata made his debut in national politics during the 1915 General Election and was elected to the Lower House as a representative from Saitama.  He was subsequently reelected six times. He served in a number of vice ministerial posts, and became Secretary-General of the Rikken Seiyūkai political party in July 1927.

In December 1931, Hata was picked to be Minister of Colonial Affairs under the Inukai administration, which he held until the collapse of that administration following the May 15 Incident in May 1932.  Hata died the following year at age 61.

References 
 Rengō Puresu Sha, The Japan biographical encyclopedia & who's who, Issue 3 Japan Biographical Research Dept., Rengo Press, Ltd., 1964. page 256

1872 births
1933 deaths
People from Tokyo
Members of the House of Representatives (Empire of Japan)
Governors of Akita Prefecture
Governors of Tokushima Prefecture
Government ministers of Japan
University of Tokyo alumni
Rikken Seiyūkai politicians